Joyce Lefevre (born 28 June 1988) is a Belgian Paralympic athlete who competes in international level events. She competed at the 2020 Summer Paralympics, in 100m T34, and 800m T34. 

She competed at the  2018 European Championships, in the T34 100m, winning a  bronze medal.

References

1988 births
Living people
People from Jette
People from Deurne, Belgium
Paralympic athletes of Belgium
Belgian female wheelchair racers
Athletes (track and field) at the 2016 Summer Paralympics
Medalists at the World Para Athletics European Championships
Sportspeople from Brussels
21st-century Belgian people